Since 1904, eight Spaniards have been awarded the Nobel Prize - six in the field of literature and two in medicine. The latest winner, Mario Vargas Llosa, is a Peruvian-Spanish dual national.

Laureates

References

Spain